The Battle of Ertsukhi was fought, in the 12th century, between the armies of the Kingdom of Georgia and the Seljuk Turks in southeastern part of Georgia in Ertsukhi, on the plains southeast of Tbilisi.

History 
The Kingdom of Kakheti-Hereti had been a tributary to the Seljuk Empire since the 1080s. However, in the 1104, the energetic Georgian king David IV ( 1089-1125) was able to exploit internal unrest in the Seljuk state and successfully campaigned against the Seljuk vassal state Kakheti-Hereti, finally turning it into one of his Saeristavo. The king of Kakheti-Hereti, Agsartan II, was captured by the Georgian nobles Baramisdze and Arshiani and was imprisoned in Kutaisi.

The Seljuk Sultan Berkyaruq (1092-1105) sent a large army to Georgia to retake Kakheti and Hereti. the battle was fought in southeastern part of the Kingdom, in the village of Ertsukhi located in the plains southeast of Tbilisi. King David of Georgia personally took part in the battle, where the Seljuks decisively defeated the Georgians causing their army to flee. The Seljuk Turks then turned the Emirate of Tbilisi once again into one of their vassals.

Folklore
According to a legendary tradition described in The Georgian Chronicles, when David removed his armor after the battle, piled up blood splashed down from behind his armor plate. This led the by-standers to believe that their king was wounded, when in fact the blood belonged to the enemies that the king had slain in battle.

Notes 

Ertsukhi 1104
Ertsukhi 1104
Ertsukhi
1104 in Asia
1104 in Europe
12th century in the Kingdom of Georgia